Abazu is an autonomous community in Ikeduru Local Government Area of Imo State, Nigeria. It comprises three main villages and several kindreds and clans. The villages that make up Abazu are Umunnemoche, Ebem na Azu, and Ekpere na Oroka. The Village Square of Abazu is located at Amaudara.

Location and Geography 
Abazu is an autonomous community in southeastern Nigeria. Abazu is located along Owerri - Okigwe expressway. It has a latitude of 5.558922 and a longitude of 7.094592. It has a border with Akabo, Uzoagba, and Amatta.

References

Populated places in Imo State
Villages in Igboland
Communities in Igboland
Igbo subgroups